Divinity School may refer to:

 The common noun, divinity school
 When used as a proper noun, may be an abbreviated reference to one of the following:
 Beeson Divinity School
 Berkeley Divinity School
 Brite Divinity School
 Campbell University Divinity School
 Church Divinity School of the Pacific
 Colgate Rochester Crozer Divinity School
 Divinity School, Oxford
 Duke Divinity School
 Episcopal Divinity School
 Trinity Evangelical Divinity School
 University of Chicago Divinity School
 Vanderbilt University Divinity School
 Wake Forest University School of Divinity
 Yale Divinity School